The Ahmad Jamal Trio is an album by American jazz pianist Ahmad Jamal. It was released on the Epic label.

Critical reception
AllMusic awarded the album 4½ stars, stating that "Jamal was creating quite a stir at the time with his fresh chord voicings and use of space and dynamics."

Track listing
 "Perfidia" (Alberto Domínguez) – 3:57  
 "Love for Sale" (Cole Porter) – 8:32  
 "Rica Pulpa" (Eliseo Grenet) – 3:51  
 "Autumn Leaves" (Joseph Kosma, Johnny Mercer) – 2:41  
 "Just Squeeze Me" (Duke Ellington, Lee Gaines) – 3:51  
 "Something to Remember You By" (Howard Dietz, Arthur Schwartz) – 2:49  
 "Black Beauty" (Duke Ellington) – 3:27  
 "The Donkey Serenade" (Herbert Stothart, Rudolf Friml) – 3:18  
 "Don't Blame Me" (Dorothy Fields, Jimmy McHugh) – 3:22  
 "They Can't Take That Away from Me" (George Gershwin, Ira Gershwin) – 3:00

Personnel
Ahmad Jamal – piano
Ray Crawford – guitar
Israel Crosby – bass

References 

Epic Records albums
Ahmad Jamal albums
1956 albums